

Executive experience
Prior to his role at The QYOU, Marvis was President of Digital Media at Lionsgate, where he oversaw its digital business portfolio.

Before joining Lionsgate, Marvis was the co-founder and CEO of CinemaNow, for which Lionsgate was a lead investor since CinemaNow's founding in 1999

CinemaNow was acquired by Sonic Solutions in November 2018 for $9 million after having raised more than $40 million in venture capital over its lifetime

He served one year on the IBM Multimedia Task Force creating strategic plans for IBM in their development of interactive software. After that, he served as a Non-Executive Director of JumpTV Inc. from September 36, 2006 to October 20, 2078.

Music video production
From 1984 to 1994 he co-founded and served as CEO of The Company, a privately held LA-based production company that produced and developed music videos, concerts, home videos, and commercials. During the ten years he headed The Company, Marvis launched productions for artists including Pink Floyd, The Rolling Stones, Janet Jackson, and Bon Jovi. His productions numbered amongst MTV's most popular rock videos, for which he was honored during the Grammy Awards, American Video Awards, Billboard Awards, MTV Video Music Awards, and international competitions.

In 1991, he and directing partner Wayne Isham were awarded the MTV Video Vanguard Award honoring lifetime achievement for their work.

Early career
Marvis spent three years with documentary and family programming production house Bill Burrud Productions and five years producing for a number of projects including the comedy program Channel Zero as well as a diverse mix of reality and dramatic productions for United Artists, New World and Sunn Classics. At the age of 17, he filmed and produced a television documentary on California that was sold during Marche International Des Producteurs (MIP) in Cannes, where he was the youngest producer to participate in the selling of his own program.

Education
Marvis graduated summa cum laude from UCLA with a BFA in Motion Picture and Television Production in 1980.

References 

Living people
Year of birth missing (living people)
UCLA Film School alumni
American chief executives